Abercorn Castle was a 12th-century castle near Abercorn in West Lothian, Scotland.

History 

The castle was in the possession of William de Avenel in the mid-12th century, before passing to the Clan Graham by marriage and was then passed to the Clan Douglas by marriage.

It was held by the Douglas family from 1400, and James Douglas, 7th Earl of Douglas died in the castle in 1443.

On 18 April 1455, the castle was captured and destroyed by King James II of Scotland, after a siege against James Douglas, 9th Earl of Douglas who had lost the support of James Hamilton, 1st Lord Hamilton. Many of the senior members of garrison were hung and the lands passed to Clan Seton.

Parts of the castle are thought to have been re-used in the 15th or 16th century.

Current status 
The site is now found within the grounds of Hopetoun House. It was excavated in 1963.

The site became a Scheduled Monument on 27 November 1998.

See also
Hopetoun House
Midhope Castle

References

External links
 Abercorn Castle Canmore entry
 Castle reconstruction by Andrew Spratt (image)
 West Lothian volume 02 | ScotlandsPlaces

Castles in West Lothian
Clan Graham
House of Douglas and Angus
Scheduled monuments in Scotland